Atul Kochhar (born 31 August 1969) is an Indian-born, British-based chef and television personality. Kochhar was one of the first two Indian chefs to receive a Michelin star, awarded in London in 2001 whilst at Tamarind. He opened his own restaurant Benares, which won him a second Michelin star in 2007. Since then he has opened several other restaurants: Sindhu and Hawkyns in Buckinghamshire and Indian Essence in Petts Wood, Kent.

Kochhar makes regular appearances on television shows, and has written a number of cookbooks: Simple Indian, Fish, Indian Style, Curries of the World, and 30 Minute Curries.

Early life
Kochhar was born in Jamshedpur, India, and began his cooking career at The Oberoi Group of hotels in India (1989–1994). He gained his diploma in Hotel Management from The Institute of Hotel Management Chennai. In June 1993 Kochhar graduated to the five star deluxe Oberoi Hotel in New Delhi. Here he worked as a sous chef in one of the five restaurants in the hotel supervising a staff of 18 and immediately raising the standards in the kitchen. In January 1994 Kochhar moved to the restaurant of chef Bernard Kunig. Kochhar continued his cooking career and in January 2001 at the age of 31, Kochhar was the first Indian chef to be awarded a Michelin star.

Restaurants 
Kochhar was fired from London's Benares restaurant in 2018 after sending a series of anti-Islamic tweets to actress Priyanka Chopra. Kochhar's contract with JW Marriott Marquis Hotel in Dubai was also terminated following these tweets.

Kochhar opened the restaurant Kanishka in March 2019 on London's Maddox Street.

Media
Kochhar has been featured on BBC2's television series  Million Pound Menu. He previously presented a series called Curry on with Atul Kochhar on the B4U network and a series on Malaysia called Kochhar's Spice Kitchen. Kochhar appeared in Masterchef Goes Large, season two and BBC2's Great British Menu in a bid to create a menu in honour of the Queen's 80th Birthday. He also appeared in Market Kitchen and Saturday Kitchen series 1–3.

Publications

 Fish, Indian Style (2008), Absolute, 
 Atul's Curries of the World (2013), Absolute, 
 Benares: Michelin Starred Cooking (2015), Absolute, 
 Simple Indian (2016), Quadrille, 
 30 Minute Curries (2017), Absolute Press,  
 Curry Everyday (2022), Absolute Press,

References

British people of Indian descent
Academics of the University of West London
Living people
People from Jamshedpur
Chefs of Indian cuisine
British restaurateurs
British chefs
British television chefs
1969 births
Head chefs of Michelin starred restaurants